Jeannette Howard Foster (November 3, 1895 – July 26, 1981) was an American librarian, professor, poet, and researcher in the field of lesbian literature. She pioneered the study of popular fiction and ephemera in order to excavate both overt and covert lesbian themes. Her years of pioneering data collection culminated in her 1957 study Sex Variant Women in Literature, which has become a seminal resource in LGBT studies. Initially self-published by Foster via Vantage Press, it was photoduplicated and reissued in 1975 by Diana Press and reissued in 1985 by Naiad Press with updating additions and commentary by Barbara Grier.

Biography
Jeannette Howard Foster was born on November 3, 1895 in Oak Park, Illinois, daughter of mechanical engineer Winslow Howard Foster (b. January 10, 1869) and Anna Mabel Burr. She attended Rockford College and graduated with a degree in chemistry in 1918. Foster earned a Ph.D. at the Graduate Library School of the University of Chicago.  She taught library science at the Drexel Institute of Technology from 1937 to 1948.  She was librarian at the Institute for Sex Research at Indiana University during the years 1948 to 1952 where she worked with Alfred Kinsey. In 1952 Foster left the Institute for Sex Research to move to Kansas City with her partner Hazel Toliver (1909-1997), and Toliver's mother. Foster started a new position at the University of Missouri- Kansas City (UMKC) as a reference and interlibrary loan librarian. It was while working at UMKC, in 1957, that Foster published her book Sex Variant Women in Literature: A Historical and Quantitative Survey. Foster had spent over two decades researching and writing the work, the first of its kind, which chronicled approximately 2600 years of female 'sex variants' (lesbians, bisexuals and transsexuals) in literature. In 1960 Foster retired from UMKC and moved to St. Charles with Toliver, her mother, and another lesbian companion of Toliver's, Dorothy Ross (1905-1986). They lived there until 1974, when Toliver retired and they all decided to finally settle in Pocahontas, Arkansas. Foster's health had begun to decline in the mid-1960s, and on 7 January 1974 she had lumbar spinal surgery which left her with nerve damage. Foster opted to move into a nursing home to avoid burdening her companions with her care, and on 1 April 1975 she moved into the nearby Randolph County Nursing Home. 

Foster was the recipient of the 1974 Stonewall Book Award for Sex Variant Women in Literature. She contributed fiction and reviews to The Ladder. Foster lived to see her 1956 book hailed as a founding document of a new area of scholarship. She was friends with Valerie Taylor and Marie Kuda, who founded the first national lesbian writers' conference in the United States. Taylor dedicated the first conference in 1974 to Foster. In October 1974, after Foster was awarded the Stonewall Book Award, Valerie Taylor published a tribute to her in the Chicago Gay Crusader, underlining the importance of Sex Variant Women in Literature and describing it as a sourcebook not just for homophile researchers but also for literature lovers, social trends students, and those who fight for human liberation.

In 1998 Foster was inducted into the Chicago Gay and Lesbian Hall of Fame.

In 2008, the first biography of Foster, Sex Variant Woman by Joanne Passet, was published.  In 2019, Foster was inducted into the Chicago Literary Hall of Fame.

References 

1895 births
1981 deaths
LGBT studies academics
American LGBT writers
American librarians
American women librarians
University of Chicago Graduate Library School alumni
Rockford University alumni
LGBT people from Illinois
LGBT academics
American women poets
20th-century American poets
20th-century American women writers
Stonewall Book Award winners
20th-century American LGBT people